Claude William Craddock (3 August 1902 – October 1976) was an English professional footballer who played as a forward in the Football League for Rochdale, Brentford, Gillingham and Darlington. He also played in the Scottish League for Dundee.

Career statistics

References

1902 births
1976 deaths
English footballers
English Football League players
Brentford F.C. players
Footballers from Grimsby
Association football forwards
Gillingham F.C. players
Dundee F.C. players
Sheppey United F.C. players
Rochdale A.F.C. players
Darlington F.C. players
Scottish Football League players
Sittingbourne F.C. players
Grays Thurrock United F.C. players
Tunbridge Wells F.C. players
Southern Football League players